Tatjana Maria and Heather Watson were the defending champions, but only Maria chose to defend her title, partnering Christina McHale. The pair lost in the quarterfinals to Cornelia Lister and Renata Voráčová.

Victoria Azarenka and Zheng Saisai won the title, defeating Desirae Krawczyk and Giuliana Olmos in the final, 6–1, 6–2.

Seeds

Draw

Draw

References

External Links
Main Draw

Abierto Mexicano Telcel - Doubles
Women's Doubles